Ghost is a 2015 Russian comedy film starring Fedor Bondarchuk and Semyon Treskunov.

The film has earned about 350 million Russian rubles. This was the first Russian film to use Dolby Atmos technology.

Plot
Only yesterday Yuri Gordeev was an ambitious aircraft designer, a ladies' man, and on the verge of his triumph. His plane YG-1 was supposed to be a real breakthrough in domestic aviation. But today, no one sees or hears about him, and a rival business smoothly causes Yuri's company to close. That is because Yuri drove while inebriated, got into a car accident, died and became a ghost.

Seventh grader Ivan Kuznetsov, or Vanya for short, was always in an empty place. A victim of an overprotective mother, the object of ridicule from classmates, he is afraid to even talk to a girl with whom he has been in love for a long time. Yuri has one week to complete his life's work and to raise his new aircraft into the air, while Vanya is the only one who can see and help him.

Cast
Fedor Bondarchuk - Yury Gordeyev
Semyon Treskunov - Vanya
Yan Tsapnik - Gena, Yuri's best friend
Kseniya Lavrova-Glinka - Vanya's Mother
Igor Ugolnikov - Polzunov, Yuri's rival business
Anna Antonova - Lena Gordeyeva, Yuri's wife
Ани Петросян - Alexei Lukin - Stas''

Production
During the filming actor Yan Tsapnik broke his leg, and after this it was written into the script and was entered in the final scenes of the film.

The aircraft of YUG-1, which is designed by Yuri Gordeyev, was made entirely using the computer graphics company Main Road Post. This was because none of the most modern and highly technical counterparts could convey all the uniqueness of this aircraft.

References

External links
Official page on STV website
 

2015 films
Russian comedy films
2010s Russian-language films
2010s children's comedy films
Russian children's fantasy films
Films about the afterlife
Films set in Moscow
2010s ghost films
2015 comedy films
Russian aviation films
Films directed by Aleksandr Voytinskiy